Son Seol-Min  (born 26 April 1990) is a South Korean footballer who plays as a midfielder for Gangwon FC in the K League Challenge.

External links 

1990 births
Living people
Association football midfielders
South Korean footballers
Jeonnam Dragons players
Gangwon FC players
Daejeon Hana Citizen FC players
K League 1 players
K League 2 players
Korea National League players